<noinclude>

Silická Jablonica is a village and municipality in the Rožňava District in the Košice Region of middle-eastern Slovakia.

History
In historical records the village was first mentioned in 1386.

Geography
The village lies at an altitude of 256 metres and covers an area of 25.566 km2.
It has a population of about 230 people.

Culture
The village has a public library.

External links
 Silická Jablonica
http://www.statistics.sk/mosmis/eng/run.html

Villages and municipalities in Rožňava District